is  1949 Japanese film and the final installment of a wartime film trilogy, directed by Keisuke Sasaki, featuring the cast from the previous two Ringing Bell Hill films.

Production Notes
The success of the Ringing Bell Hill trilogy spawned a weekend radio series of 15-minute episodes, produced by NHK, featuring further adventures of a demobilized soldier and a group of war orphans under his care on Ringing Bell Hill.

List of a film trilogy

 鐘の鳴る丘 第一篇 隆太の巻 (Kane no naru oka: dai-ichi hen, ryūta no maki; Slope of the Ringing Bell Hill: the first volume) (1948)
 鐘の鳴る丘 第二篇 修吉の巻 (Kane no naru oka: dai-ni hen, shūkichi no maki; Slope of the Ringing Bell Hill: the second volume) (1949)
 鐘の鳴る丘 第三篇 クロの巻 (Kane no naru oka: dai-san hen, kuro no maki; Slope of the Ringing Bell Hill: the third volume) (1949)

Cast
 Keiji Sada
 Taeko Takasugi
 Masao Inoue
 Michiko Namiki
 Tōdō Gekidan

References

External links 
 
 

1949 films
Japanese black-and-white films
1940s Japanese-language films
Shochiku films
Japanese drama films
1949 drama films